Claire Dorothea Taylor Palley, OBE (born 17 February 1931) is a South African academic and lawyer who specialises in constitutional and human rights law. She was the first woman to hold a Chair in Law at a United Kingdom university when she was appointed at Queen's University Belfast in 1970.

Life 

Pulley was born in South Africa in 1931. She attended Durban Girls' College before she went on to study at the University of Cape Town and after graduating took up a post as a lecturer in the Law School. She lived with her then husband Ahrn Palley for a while in Southern Rhodesia. The Palleys moved to Rhodesia in the belief that it would offer a more liberal political regime than the apartheid system which then existed in South Africa. From 1962-1970 Ahrn Palley was Rhodesia's only Independent MP representing the predominantly black constituency of Highfield.  As an authority on constitutional and human rights law, Claire was Constitutional Adviser to the African National Council at the constitutional talks on Rhodesia held in Geneva in 1976.

Her books cover international relations and contemporary history, as seen from the standpoint of a constitutional, international and human rights lawyer, minority rights 

Her pioneering appointment as the first British woman law professor in 1970 at Queen's University Belfast was initially overlooked. It was not until the appointment of Gillian White at Manchester in 1975 (the second woman to become a law professor in the United Kingdom) that Claire Palley's appointment was mentioned in The Times.

She was later Professor of Law and Master of Darwin College, University of Kent from 1973 to 1984 and became Principal of St Anne's College, Oxford in 1984. A hall of residence at St Anne's is named for her.

In 1997 she was received an OBE for services to human rights.

Selected publications 

 Constitutional Law and Minorities (Minority Rights Group, 1978)
 The United Kingdom and Human Rights (The Hamlyn Trust, 1991)
 An International Relations Debacle: The UN Secretary-General's Mission of Good Offices in Cyprus 1999-2004 (Hart Publishing, 2005)

References

External links

 Papers of Professor Claire Palley
 St Anne's College, Oxford
 Palley, Claire Dorothea Taylor (b 1931) nee Swait, The National Archives
about her contribution to human rights

1931 births
Living people
20th-century South African lawyers
Academics of Queen's University Belfast
Academics of the University of Kent
Alumni of the University of London
British Jews
British legal scholars
Members of the Middle Temple
Place of birth missing (living people)
Principals of St Anne's College, Oxford
South African emigrants to Rhodesia
South African emigrants to the United Kingdom
South African Jews
South African Officers of the Order of the British Empire
South African people of English-Jewish descent
South African women lawyers
University of Cape Town alumni
Women legal scholars
20th-century women lawyers